Brendon Paul Bracewell (born 14 September 1959) is a former New Zealand Test cricketer. Born in Auckland, he is the younger brother of John Bracewell. He was educated at Tauranga Boys' College and was in the 1st XI from 1974 to 1978. He frequently suffered injuries throughout his playing career. Bracewell also played rugby for King Country and for Western Australia.

Bracewell operates Bracewell Cricket Academy, a private cricket coaching academy based in Napier. His son Doug Bracewell plays for Central Districts and the New Zealand cricket team.

References

External links
 

1959 births
Living people
Central Districts cricketers
New Zealand One Day International cricketers
New Zealand Test cricketers
New Zealand cricketers
Northern Districts cricketers
Otago cricketers
New Zealand rugby union players
Brendon
South Island cricketers